Raymond Keith Rudd (born 8 May 1946) is a former English cricketer. Rudd was a left-handed batsman who bowled left-arm fast-medium. He was born at Terrington St Clement, Norfolk.

Rudd made his debut for Norfolk against Cambridgeshire in the 1971 Minor Counties Championship. In 1973, Rudd was selected to play for Minor Counties North in the Benson & Hedges Cup, making a single List A appearance against Lancashire at Old Trafford. Lancashire won the toss and elected to bat, making 275/5 in their 55 overs, with Rudd taking the wicket of Harry Pilling, to finish with figures of 1/46. Minor Counties North were dismissed for 127 in their chase, with Rudd making a single run before he was dismissed by Peter Lever. He continued to play minor counties cricket for Norfolk until 1984, making forty Minor Counties Championship appearances, as well as making a single MCCA Knockout Trophy appearance in his final season against Bedfordshire.

References

External links
Keith Rudd at ESPNcricinfo
Keith Rudd at CricketArchive

1946 births
Living people
People from Terrington St Clement
English cricketers
Norfolk cricketers
Minor Counties cricketers